Plonk may refer to:
Plonk (wine), poor quality wine
Ronnie Lane or Plonk, British musician and member of Small Faces
Dr. Plonk, a 2007 Australian film, directed by Rolf de Heer
Plonk (TV series), a 2014 Australian TV series